The Convention on Cluster Munitions (CCM) is an international treaty that prohibits all use, transfer, production, and stockpiling of cluster bombs, a type of explosive weapon which scatters submunitions ("bomblets") over an area. Additionally, the convention establishes a framework to support victim assistance, clearance of contaminated sites, risk reduction education, and stockpile destruction. The convention was adopted on  2008 in Dublin, and was opened for signature on  2008 in Oslo. It entered into force on  2010, six months after it was ratified by 30 states. As of February 2022, a total of 123 states are committed to the goal of the convention, with 110 states that have ratified it, and 13 states that have signed the convention but not yet ratified it.

Countries that ratify the convention will be obliged "never under any circumstances to":

The treaty allows certain types of weapons with submunitions that do not have the indiscriminate area effects or pose the same unexploded ordnance risks as cluster munitions. Weapons containing submunitions which all individually weigh at least  are also excluded. A limited number of prohibited weapons and submunitions can be acquired and kept for training in, and development of, detection, clearance and destruction techniques and counter-measures.

History

The impetus for the treaty, like that of the 1997 Ottawa Treaty to limit landmines, has been concern over the severe damage and risks to civilians from explosive weapons during and long after attacks. A varying proportion of submunitions dispersed by cluster bombs fail to explode on impact and can lie unexploded for years until disturbed. The sometimes brightly-colored munitions are not camouflaged, but have been compared to toys or Easter eggs, attracting children at play. Human rights activists claim that one in four casualties resulting from submunitions that fail to explode on impact are children, who often pick up and play with the explosive canisters well after the conflict has ended. The 2006 Lebanon War provided momentum for the campaign to ban cluster bombs. The United Nations estimated that up to 40% of Israeli cluster bomblets failed to explode on impact. Norway organized the independent Oslo Process after discussions at the traditional disarmament forum in Geneva fell through in November 2006.

The cluster munitions ban process, also known as the Oslo Process, began in February 2007 in Oslo. At this time, 46 nations issued the "Oslo Declaration", committing themselves to:
Conclude by 2008 a legally binding international instrument that prohibits the use and stockpiling of cluster munitions that cause unacceptable harm to civilians and secure adequate provision of care and rehabilitation to survivors and clearance of contaminated areas.

The Oslo Process held meetings in Lima in May 2007 and Vienna in December 2007. In February 2008, 79 countries adopted the "Wellington Declaration", setting forth the principles to be included in the convention.

Adoption

Delegates from 107 nations agreed to the final draft of the treaty at the end of a ten-day meeting held in May 2008 in Dublin, Ireland. Its text was formally adopted on  2008 by 107 nations, including 7 of the 14 countries that have used cluster bombs and 17 of the 34 countries that have produced them.

The treaty was opposed by a number of countries that produce or stockpile significant quantities of cluster munitions, including China, Russia, the United States, India, Israel, Pakistan and Brazil. The U.S. has acknowledged humanitarian concerns about the use of cluster munitions, but insisted that the proper venue for a discussion of cluster munitions was the forum attached to the Convention on Certain Conventional Weapons, which includes all major military powers. The U.S. has further stated that the development and introduction of "smart" cluster munitions, where each submunition contains its own targeting and guidance system as well as an auto-self-destruct mechanism, means that the problematic munitions are being moved away from, in any case. In 2006, Barack Obama voted to support a legislative measure to limit use of the bombs, while his general election opponent John McCain and his primary opponent Hillary Clinton both voted against it. According to the Pentagon's 2008 policy, cluster munitions are actually humane weapons. "Because future adversaries will likely use civilian shields for military targets – for example by locating a military target on the roof of an occupied building – use of unitary weapons could result in more civilian casualties and damage than cluster munitions," the policy claims. "Blanket elimination of cluster munitions is therefore unacceptable due not only to negative military consequences but also due to potential negative consequences for civilians."

The treaty allows certain types of weapons with submunitions that do not have the indiscriminate area effects or pose the same unexploded ordnance risks as the prohibited weapons. Each submunition must have the capability to detect and engage a single target object and contain electronic self-destruct and self-deactivation devices. Weapons containing submunitions which each weigh at least  are also excluded. Australia, which supports the treaty, stated that the convention does not prohibit the SMArt 155 artillery shell that it has bought, which releases two self-guided self-destructing submunitions.

In response to U.S. lobbying, and also concerns raised by diplomats from Australia, Canada, Japan, the United Kingdom and others, the treaty includes a provision allowing signatory nations to cooperate militarily with non-signatory nations. This provision is designed to provide legal protections to the military personnel of signatory nations engaged in military operations with the U.S. or other non-signatory nations that might use cluster munitions. David Miliband, who was Britain's foreign secretary under Labour, approved the use of a loophole to manoeuvre around the ban which allows the US to keep the munitions on British territory.

Prior to the Dublin meeting, the United Kingdom was thought to be one of a group of nations in a pivotal role, whereby their cooperation could make or break the treaty. In an unexpected turn of events shortly before the end of the conference, Prime Minister Gordon Brown declared that the United Kingdom would withdraw all of its cluster bombs from service. This was done despite intense behind-the-scenes lobbying by the U.S. and objections by British government personnel who saw utility in the weapons.

The CCM was opened for signature at a ceremony at Oslo City Hall on 3– 2008. By the end of the ceremony, 94 states had signed the treaty, including four (Ireland, the Holy See, Sierra Leone and Norway) which had also submitted their instruments of ratification. Signatories included 21 of the 27 member-states of the European Union and 18 of the 26 countries in NATO. Among the signatories were several states affected by cluster munitions, including Laos and Lebanon.

In November 2008, ahead of the signing conference in Oslo, the European Parliament passed a resolution calling on all European Union governments to sign and ratify the convention, as several EU countries had not yet declared their intention to do so. Finland had declared it would not sign, having just signed the Ottawa Treaty and replaced its mine arsenal largely with cluster munitions.

Entry into force
According to article 17 of the treaty, the convention entered into force "on the first day of the sixth month after the month in which the thirtieth instrument of ratification, acceptance, approval or accession has been deposited". Since the thirtieth ratification was deposited during February 2010, the convention entered into force on  2010; by that point, 38 nations had ratified the treaty.

As the convention entered into force, UN Secretary-General Ban Ki-moon spoke of "not only the world's collective revulsion at these abhorrent weapons, but also the power of collaboration among governments, civil society and the United Nations to change attitudes and policies on a threat faced by all humankind". A spokesman for the International Committee of the Red Cross said "These weapons are a relic of the Cold War. They are a legacy that has to be eliminated because they increasingly won't work." Nobel peace prize winner Jody Williams called the convention "the most important disarmament and humanitarian convention in over a decade".

Anti-cluster munitions campaigners praised the rapid progress made in the adoption of the convention, and expressed hope that even non-signatories – such as China, North Korea, Russia, and the US – would be discouraged from using the weapons by the entry into force of the convention. As one of the countries that did not ratify the treaty, the United States said that cluster bombs are a legal form of weapon, and that they had a "clear military utility in combat." It also said that compared to other types of weapons, cluster bombs are less harmful to civilians.

Article 11 required the first meeting of states parties to be held within 12 months of the entry into force. The first such meeting was held in Laos in November 2010. There is a president, currently Swiss ambassador Félix Baumann. 

To date, the United States and Russia have not signed this convention.

According to Cluster Munition Monitor 2022, the list of 16 countries that refuse to sign the convention and produce cluster munitions included Brazil, China, Egypt, Greece, Iran, Israel, India, North Korea, Pakistan, Poland, Romania, Russia, Singapore, South Korea, the United States and Turkey.

Use of cluster munitions

State parties 

As of July 2021, there were 110 states parties to the convention.

Another 15 states have signed, but not ratified the convention.

See also 
 Arms control
 Lawfare
 Human Rights Watch
 Handicap International
 Mines Advisory Group

Notes 
 The French title is ":fr:Convention sur les armes à sous-munitions"

References

External links 
 Convention on Cluster Munitions—full text, articles, State parties and signatories
 Procedural history and related documents on the Convention on Cluster Munitions in the Historic Archives of the United Nations Audiovisual Library of International Law

Official
 clusterconvention.org—official website
 Text of the treaty
 Signatures and ratifications (United Nations treaty collection)
 Dublin Diplomatic Conference website

Non-governmental organisations
 Cluster munitions, ICRC
 Cluster Munition Coalition
 Ban Advocates—voices from affected communities
 People's Treaty—petition in support of the convention
 MAG (Mines Advisory Group)

Cluster munition
Arms control treaties
International humanitarian law treaties
2008 in Ireland
Treaties concluded in 2008
Treaties entered into force in 2010
Mine action
Treaties of Afghanistan
Treaties of Albania
Treaties of Andorra
Treaties of Antigua and Barbuda
Treaties of Australia
Treaties of Austria
Treaties of Belgium
Treaties of Belize
Treaties of Benin
Treaties of Bolivia
Treaties of Bosnia and Herzegovina
Treaties of Botswana
Treaties of Bulgaria
Treaties of Burkina Faso
Treaties of Burundi
Treaties of Cameroon
Treaties of Canada
Treaties of Cape Verde
Treaties of Chad
Treaties of Chile
Treaties of Colombia
Treaties of the Comoros
Treaties of the Republic of the Congo
Treaties of the Cook Islands
Treaties of Costa Rica
Treaties of Ivory Coast
Treaties of Croatia
Treaties of Cuba
Treaties of the Czech Republic
Treaties of Denmark
Treaties of the Dominican Republic
Treaties of Ecuador
Treaties of El Salvador
Treaties of Fiji
Treaties of France
Treaties of the Gambia
Treaties of Germany
Treaties of Ghana
Treaties of Grenada
Treaties of Guatemala
Treaties of Guinea
Treaties of Guinea-Bissau
Treaties of Guyana
Treaties of the Holy See
Treaties of Honduras
Treaties of Hungary
Treaties of Iceland
Treaties of Iraq
Treaties of Ireland
Treaties of Italy
Treaties of Japan
Treaties of Laos
Treaties of Lebanon
Treaties of Lesotho
Treaties of Liechtenstein
Treaties of Lithuania
Treaties of Luxembourg
Treaties of Madagascar
Treaties of Malawi
Treaties of Mali
Treaties of Malta
Treaties of Mauritania
Treaties of Mauritius
Treaties of Mexico
Treaties of Moldova
Treaties of Monaco
Treaties of Montenegro
Treaties of Mozambique
Treaties of Namibia
Treaties of Nauru
Treaties of the Netherlands
Treaties of New Zealand
Treaties of Nicaragua
Treaties of Niger
Treaties of Norway
Treaties of Palau
Treaties of the State of Palestine
Treaties of Panama
Treaties of Paraguay
Treaties of Peru
Treaties of Portugal
Treaties of Rwanda
Treaties of Samoa
Treaties of San Marino
Treaties of Senegal
Treaties of Seychelles
Treaties of Sierra Leone
Treaties of Slovakia
Treaties of Slovenia
Treaties of South Africa
Treaties of Spain
Treaties of Saint Kitts and Nevis
Treaties of Saint Vincent and the Grenadines
Treaties of Eswatini
Treaties of Sweden
Treaties of Switzerland
Treaties of North Macedonia
Treaties of Togo
Treaties of Trinidad and Tobago
Treaties of Tunisia
Treaties of the United Kingdom
Treaties of Uruguay
Treaties of Zambia
Treaties extended to the Caribbean Netherlands
Treaties extended to Greenland
Treaties extended to the Isle of Man